Ivan Puzić (born 15 February 1996) is a Croatian professional ice hockey defenceman.

Puzić played ten games for HC Vítkovice of the Czech Extraliga from 2016 to 2018. He joined KHL Medveščak Zagreb of the Erste Bank Eishockey Liga on 8 June 2018, but departed by December and joined the Coventry Blaze of the Elite Ice Hockey League. On 30 January 2020, Puzić joined Podhale Nowy Targ of the Polska Hokej Liga.

Puzić is also a member of the Croatian national team and most recently played in the qualifiers for the 2022 Winter Olympics.

References

External links

1996 births
Living people
KHL Sisak players
Coventry Blaze players
Croatian ice hockey defencemen
AZ Havířov players
KHL Medveščak Zagreb players
Podhale Nowy Targ players
HC RT Torax Poruba players
Sportspeople from Zagreb
Hokej Šumperk 2003 players
HC Vítkovice players
Croatian expatriate ice hockey people
Croatian expatriate sportspeople in the Czech Republic
Croatian expatriate sportspeople in England
Croatian expatriate sportspeople in Poland
Croatian expatriate sportspeople in France
Expatriate ice hockey players in Poland
Expatriate ice hockey players in England
Expatriate ice hockey players in France
Expatriate ice hockey players in the Czech Republic